is a Japanese electrical engineer who shared the Nobel Prize in Chemistry in 2002 for developing a novel method for mass spectrometric analyses of biological macromolecules with John Bennett Fenn and Kurt Wüthrich (the latter for work in NMR spectroscopy).

Early life and education
Tanaka was born and raised in Toyama, Japan, his biological mother died one month after he was born. Tanaka graduated from Tohoku University with a bachelor's degree in electrical engineering in 1983, afterward he joined Shimadzu Corporation, where he engaged in the development of mass spectrometers.

Soft laser desorption

For mass spectrometry analyses of a macromolecule, such as a protein, the analyte must be ionized and vaporized by laser irradiation. The problem is that the direct irradiation of an intense laser pulse on a macromolecule causes cleavage of the analyte into tiny fragments and the loss of its structure. In February 1985, Tanaka found that by using a mixture of ultra fine metal powder in glycerol as a matrix, an analyte can be ionized without losing its structure. His work was filed as a patent application in 1985, and after the patent application was made public reported at the Annual Conference of the Mass Spectrometry Society of Japan held in Kyoto, in May 1987 and became known as soft laser desorption (SLD).

However, there was some criticism about his winning the prize, saying that contribution by two German scientists, Franz Hillenkamp and Michael Karas was also big enough not to be dismissed, and therefore they should also be included as prize winners. This is because they first reported in 1985 a method, with higher sensitivity using a small organic compound as a matrix, that they named matrix-assisted laser desorption/ionization (MALDI). Also Tanaka's SLD is not used currently for biomolecules analysis, meanwhile MALDI is widely used in mass spectrometry research laboratories. But while MALDI was developed prior to SLD, it was not used to ionize proteins until after Tanaka's report.

Recognition
1989 – Award of the Mass Spectrometry Society of Japan
2002 – Nobel Prize in Chemistry
2002 – Order of Culture
2002 – Person of Cultural Merit
2002 – Honorary doctor of Tohoku University
2003 – Honorary citizenship of Toyama Prefecture
2003 – Special Award of the Mass Spectrometry Society of Japan
2006 – Member of Japan Academy

See also

 History of mass spectrometry
 List of Japanese Nobel laureates

References

External links 

 
 Nobel Prize Announcement (Shimadzu Corporation)
 Tanaka Nobel Prize lecture
 Koichi Tanaka

1959 births
Living people
Japanese electrical engineers
Japanese Nobel laureates
Mass spectrometrists
Nobel laureates in Chemistry
People from Toyama (city)
Recipients of the Order of Culture
Tohoku University alumni